Tremetousia ( [];  or ) is a village in the Larnaca District of Cyprus, located 7 km east of Athienou. It is one of only four villages in the district under the de facto control of Northern Cyprus, the other three being Arsos, Melouseia and Pergamos.

The village is the successor of the ancient city Tremithus, mentioned by Ptolemy, Hierocles, George of Cyprus, Stephanus of Byzantium and other ancient geographers. The usurper Isaac Comnenus of Cyprus was defeated here in 1191 by Richard Coeur de Lion, who afterwards took possession of Cyprus. The city was then destroyed and survives only in the village.

Bishops of Tremithus 

The most famous of the bishops of the see of Tremithus is Saint Spyridon, who is famous throughout the Eastern Orthodox Church. Others venerated as saints are Arcadius and Nestor. Saint Spyridon himself participated in the First Council of Nicaea (325), Theopompus in the First Council of Constantinople in 381, Theodore, the author of a biography of Saint John Chrysostom, in the Third Council of Constantinople in 681, George in the Second Council of Nicaea in 787. Another Spyridon is mentioned in 1081.

References

Tremethus
Communities in Larnaca District
Populated places in Lefkoşa District